Singles, B-Sides & Live is a compilation album by English rock group Electrelane. It was released on CD in 2006 by Too Pure. Tracks 7, 8 and 9 are from their EP I Want To Be President.

Track listing

All songs were written by Electrelane, except where noted.

 "Film Music (Original Version)" – 4:11
 "Come On" – 4:50
 "Le Song (Original Version)" – 3:10
 "U.O.R. (Original Version)" – 5:23
 "John Wayne" – 2:38
 "I Love You My Farfisa" – 4:10
 "I Want to Be President" – 4:46
 "I Only Always Think" – 5:08
 "I've Been Your Fan Since Yesterday" – 5:07
 "I'm on Fire" (Bruce Springsteen) – 2:18
 "Long Dark (Albini Version)" – 4:14
 "Oh Sombra! (John Peel Session)" – 3:05
 "More Than This (Live)" (Bryan Ferry) – 4:34
 "Birds (Live)" – 4:03
 "Those Pockets are People / The Partisan (Live)" (Electrelane, Anna Marly, Hy Zaret) – 8:02
 "Today" – 8:30

Release history

References

Electrelane albums
B-side compilation albums
2006 compilation albums
Too Pure compilation albums